Virtual Sexuality is a 1999 film directed by Nick Hurran and starring Laura Fraser, Rupert Penry-Jones, Luke de Lacey, and Kieran O'Brien. The screenplay concerns a young woman who designs the perfect man at a virtual reality convention, but then an accident occurs causing the man to be brought to life.

Plot summary
17-year-old Justine (Laura Fraser) bemoans being a virgin so, after being stood-up on a date, goes to a virtual reality exhibition with her geeky friend Chas (Luke DeLacey). There she encounters a virtual makeover machine which she uses to create a 3-D image of her perfect man. After a freak power-cut Justine finds herself inside that male body, becoming her own ideal mate (Rupert Penry-Jones). Naming this alternate self "Jake", he moves in with Chas to try and come to terms with being a teenage boy.

Jake then realises that an unaltered version of Justine is still around unaware of his existence. This unaltered Justine, on meeting Jake, falls for him unaware of the complications this poses. Jake fends her off by feigning interest in the infamous local man-eater known as "the Hoover".

A frustrated Justine then decides she must lose her virginity at any cost, and dates the arrogant Alex to achieve this. As the big date looms, Chas and Jake attempt to thwart Justine's plans, and she eventually realises she prefers the unthreatening Chas.

Cast
 Laura Fraser as Justine
 Rupert Penry-Jones as Jake
 Luke de Lacey as Chas
 Kieran O'Brien as Alex
 Marcelle Duprey as Fran
 Natasha Bell as Hoover
 Steve John Shepherd as Jason
 Laura MacAulay as Monica
 Roger Frost as Frank
 Ruth Sheen as Jackie
 Laura Aikman as Lucy
 Preeya Kalidas as Charlotte
 Ram John Holder as Declan
 Amanda Holden as the Shoe Shop Assistant
 Alan Westaway as Geoff
 William Osborne as the Sex Shop Assistant

Production
The film appears to draw some of its inspiration from 1985's Weird Science, but was based on the novel Virtual Sexual Reality (1994), which was part of Chloë Rayban's four-part "Justine" series of novels. The film was produced by The Noel Gay Motion Picture Company, who were also responsible for Trainspotting.

Filming took place in various locations around London. 
The internal Virtual Reality Exhibition scenes were filmed at Elstree Studios, using a purpose built set. The tunnel was extended before filming of the explosion was done.

References

External links
 
 
 

1999 films
British sex comedy films
1990s sex comedy films
Films shot at Elstree Film Studios
Films directed by Nick Hurran
Films scored by Rupert Gregson-Williams
Columbia Pictures films
TriStar Pictures films
Teen sex comedy films
1999 comedy films
1990s English-language films
1990s British films